Lisa Hickey is an American author, advertising consultant, and social media consultant. She is the CEO of Good Men Media, Inc. and the Publisher of Good Men Magazine as part of the Good Men Project.

Education
Hickey received a Bachelor of Arts in Psychology and Sociology from the University of Rochester in 1979 where she graduated cum laude. Hickey went onto acquire a Certificate in Graphic Design from the Massachusetts College of Art in Boston, Massachusetts.

Career
In 1999, Hickey opened her own agency, Velocity Advertising. The agency was known for offering full-service capabilities to clients regardless of their geographic location. Prior to Velocity, Hickey worked for companies such as Boston's Heater Advertising (Renamed Red), Arnold Worldwide and Holland Mark Advertising. One advertisement she helped create while at Hill Holiday, a spot for Lotus Notes, has a permanent home in the Museum of Modern Art.

Hickey has also helped to resurrect Holland Mark, an agency that she had worked for in the late nineties. In 2007, Hickey was part of a team assembled by Chris Colbert to help re-open the previously troubled company.

In 2009, Hickey teamed up with media critic Steve Hall and Edward Boches, Mullen’s chief creative officer to live tweet Super Bowl XLIII advertising. Hickey, Hall, and Boches were looking to explore how pre-game advertising exposure online and real-time reactions to Super Bowl television advertising may begin to change the nature of the “Water Cooler” chatter and how consumers interact with brands.

Good Men Media, Inc.
Good Men Media, Inc. is a multi-platform, multi-media company that aims to spark a national discussion around the question of “What does it mean to be a good man?” Good Men Media publishes The Good Men Project magazine, which has received mainstream media accolades for heralding “a new era of men’s magazines.”

The for-profit arm of the Good Men Project, Good Men Media, Inc., was founded in March 2010 by Hickey, an advertising veteran and social media consultant. Hickey is also the CEO. Good Men Media gives back a portion of proceeds to the Foundation in return for licensing the Good Men Project name.  Hickey was responsible for creating a plan, figuring out an operational structure,  and raising investor funding.

Good Men Media is responsible for publishing the online magazine, The Good Men Project, and is also developing book, film and technological applications that all focus on men’s issues.

In November 2010, Good Men Media received a round of angel funding for $500,000. The Boston company plans to use the funding to expand distribution of men's related content and to support revenue growth. Investors in Good Men Media include project founder Tom Matlack and private angel investors Grant Gund, managing partner of Coppermine Capital; Jack Roberts, CEO and president of Consert Inc.; Mike Jackson, former partner at Lehman Brothers and founding partner of Ironwood and Housatonic Partners; and Michael Margolis, founder of the investment management firm Maric LS, LLC, and others.

Publications
Hickey has published three books on the subject of advertising and graphic design. Her first book, Design Secrets: Advertising: 50 Real-Life Projects Uncovered, was released in 2002 as part of the Design Secrets Series published by Rockport Publishers. The book showcases 50 real-life design projects, including original plans, sketches, interim drawings, and presentations each accompanied by informative captions that show how designers present their ideas, and solve problems.

Her second book, also published by Rockport Publishers, was released in 2004 and is titled Designs That Stand Up, Speak Out, and Can't Be Ignored: Promotions. According to the description, the book includes the A-list of projects that have found a way to grab the attention of their audiences, despite all the stimuli that can get in the way.

Her most recent book was published in 2007 by Quarry Books and is titled Little Book of Big Promotions which she co-authored with Lisa Cyr and Cheryl Dangle Cullen. The book contains design ideas, insight into the creative process and execution, and tools and information to help make the right production decisions.

Hickey is also a published poet. Her latest poem, Mail Order Tadpoles, was featured in Rattle, an online poetry magazine.

References

Living people
American women writers
American publishing chief executives
American advertising executives
University of Rochester alumni
Women in advertising
American women chief executives
Year of birth missing (living people)
21st-century American women